The 1940–41 Cypriot Cup was the seventh edition of the Cypriot Cup. A total of 4 clubs entered the competition. It began on 6 April 1940 with the semifinals and concluded on 11 May 1940 with the final which was held at GSP Stadium. APOEL won their 2nd Cypriot Cup trophy after beating AEL 2–1 in the final.

Format 
In the 1940–41 Cypriot Cup, participated all the teams of the Cypriot First Division (Lefkoşa Türk Spor Kulübü with drew from the league before the cup started).

The competition consisted of two knock-out rounds. In all rounds each tie was played as a single leg and was held at the home ground of the one of the two teams, according to the draw results. Each tie winner was qualifying to the next round. If a match was drawn, extra time was following. If extra time was drawn, there was a replay match.

Semi-finals

Final

Sources

Bibliography

See also 
 Cypriot Cup
 1940–41 Cypriot First Division

Cypriot Cup seasons
1940–41 domestic association football cups
1940–41 in Cypriot football